Polymorphomyia tridentata is a species of tephritid or fruit flies in the genus Polymorphomyia of the family Tephritidae.

Distribution
Ecuador, Peru, Bolivia, Paraguay, Argentina, Brazil.

References

Tephritinae
Insects described in 1914
Diptera of South America